The 2021 CONCACAF Beach Soccer Championship was the ninth edition of the CONCACAF Beach Soccer Championship, the premier beach soccer tournament contested by North, Central American and Caribbean men's national teams and organised the governing body of football in North America, CONCACAF. The tournament took place at the Sports Complex Fedefutbol-Plycem in San Rafael District, Alajuela, Costa Rica between 17–23 May 2021, with 12 nations contesting the title.

Mexico were the defending champions, but lost in the third-place match. El Salvador dominated the tournament, scoring fifty goals in six matches, and won their second title after beating the United States in the final, while Guatemala defeated Mexico to finish third. 

The championship also acted as the CONCACAF qualification tournament for the 2021 FIFA Beach Soccer World Cup. El Salvador and the United States, as the top two teams, qualified for the World Cup as the representatives from CONCACAF.

Teams
A total of 12 teams entered the tournament.

Draw
The draw to split the 12 teams into three groups of four was held at 11:00 EST on 8 March 2021 at CONCACAF headquarters in Miami, United States.

The procedure was as follows:

The teams were first divided into four pots of three based on their CONCACAF Beach Soccer Ranking as of December 2019. The highest ranked teams were placed in Pot 1, down through to the lowest ranked teams placed in Pot 4. The three teams in Pot 1 were seeded and each automatically assigned to the head of one of the groups. The teams from Pots 2–4 were then drawn, drawing all teams from one pot before moving onto the next. From each pot, the first team drawn was placed into Group A, the second team drawn placed into Group B and the final team drawn placed into Group C.

Officials
The following 15 officials that will referee the tournament were revealed on 5 May.

 Juan Angeles
 Gumercindo Batista
 Erlis Bermudez
 Gonzalo Carballo
 David Cruz
 Robert Gomez
 Miguel Lopez
 Mario Nava
 Arian Perez
 Warner Porras
 Alexander Rafoso
 Julio Ramos
 Jair Robles
 Luis Torres
 Jorge Tunon

Squads
 
Each team had to submit a squad of 12 players (including a minimum of two goalkeepers), from an initial provisional squad of 20 players (Regulations Articles 10.1; 10.2). 

The final rosters were revealed on 11 May.

Players and staff were required to take regular COVID-19 tests during the competition, in respect to health and safety controls regarding the COVID-19 pandemic:
On 17 May, one player and one member of staff from the Dominican Republic tested positive and were required to self-isolate. The match schedule was unaffected.
On 18 May, one player from the United States tested positive and was required to self-isolate. The match schedule was unaffected.

Group stage

Each team earns three points for a win in regulation time, two points for a win in extra time, one point for a win in a penalty shoot-out, and no points for a defeat. The top two teams from each group and the two best third placed teams advance to the quarter-finals.

Tiebreakers
The ranking of teams in each group is determined as follows (Regulations Article 12.5):
Points obtained in all group matches;
Points obtained in the matches played between the teams in question;
Goal difference in the matches played between the teams in question;
Number of goals scored in the matches played between the teams in question;
Goal difference in all group matches;
Fair play points in all group matches (only one deduction could be applied to a player in a single match): 
Drawing of lots.

All times are local, CST (UTC−6).

Group A

Group B

Group C

Ranking of third-placed teams
Since Group A consisted of three teams, for the two third placed teams from Groups B and C, their results against the teams finishing in fourth place in their groups were discounted for this ranking.

Knockout stage
20 May was allocated as a rest day.

Quarter-finals

Semi-finals
Winners qualify for the 2021 FIFA Beach Soccer World Cup.

Third place match

Final

Awards

Winners trophy

Individual awards
The following awards were given at the conclusion of the tournament:

Top goalscorers
Players with at least 5 goals are listed

11 goals

 Frank Velásquez

10 goals

 Rubén Batres

9 goals

 Exon Perdomo

7 goals

 Christian Sánchez
 Gabriel Silveira
 Lesly St. Fleur

6 goals

 Greivin Pacheco
 Tomas Canale
 Wilson González

5 goals

 Cristofher Castillo
 Jason Urbina

Final standings

Qualified teams for FIFA Beach Soccer World Cup
The following two teams from CONCACAF qualify for the 2021 FIFA Beach Soccer World Cup.

1 Bold indicates champions for that year. Italic indicates hosts for that year.

See also
2021 CONCACAF Futsal Championship

References

External links
, CONCACAF.com
Concacaf Beach Soccer Championship Costa Rica 2021 , at Beach Soccer Worldwide

Beach Soccer Championship
Beach Soccer Championship
Concacaf
International association football competitions hosted by Costa Rica
2021
2021 in beach soccer
May 2021 sports events in North America